Count  was a Japanese politician.  He was the Prime Minister of Japan in 1924, during the period which historians have called the "Taishō Democracy".

Early life 
Kiyoura was born Ōkubo Fujaku in Kamoto, Higo Province (part of present-day Yamaga, Kumamoto), as the fifth son of Ōkubo Ryōshi, the abbot of Menshōji Temple. He studied at the private school of Hirose Tanso from 1865 to 1871. During this time, he befriended Governor Nomura Morihide and took up the name "Kiyoura Keigo".

Political career 
Nomura was appointed governor of Saitama Prefecture in 1873 and appointed Kiyoura to a junior-grade civil service position there.

In 1876, at the age of twenty-six, Kiyoura joined the Ministry of Justice, and served as a prosecutor and helping draft Japan's first modern Criminal procedures laws. In 1884 he caught the attention of Yamagata Aritomo who appointed him head of the police forces in Japan, despite his relative youth of 34. Kiyoura went on to serve as Vice Minister of Justice, and Minister of Justice and while at the Ministry of Justice, he helped draft the Peace Preservation Law of 1887.

In 1891, he was selected as a member of the House of Peers by Imperial nomination. A close ally of Yamagata Aritomo, he was rewarded with numerous cabinet positions, including that of Justice Minister in the second Matsukata and second Yamagata administrations, and Justice, Agriculture and Commerce ministers in the first Katsura administration.

In 1902, Kiyoura was elevated to the title of baron (danshaku) in the kazoku peerage system. He received the 1st class of the Order of the Sacred Treasures the following year, and in 1906 was awarded with the 1st class of the Order of the Rising Sun. In September 1907, his title was elevated to viscount (shishaku).

In 1914, while he was Chairman of the Privy Council, Kiyoura received an imperial order appointing him Prime Minister of Japan following Yamamoto Gonnohyōe. However, Kiyoura declined the post because of the controversy involving the ongoing Siemens scandal and Ōkuma Shigenobu was chosen to become prime minister instead.

As prime minister 

Kiyoura accepted a second imperial order in 1924 following the Toranomon Incident, and become 23rd Prime Minister of Japan. However, his cabinet was formed at a time when non-partisan, aristocratic cabinets were falling out of favor, and the Diet's lower house held up most of his initiatives for all six months of his administration.

Perhaps the most important event during his term as prime minister was the royal wedding of Crown Prince Hirohito (the future Emperor Shōwa) with Nagako Kuniyoshi (the future Empress Kōjun) on 26 January 1924.

In 1924, he dissolved the Lower House of the Diet of Japan when faced with the three party coalition of the Kenseikai, Rikken Seiyūkai and Kakushin Club which had formed a majority in Diet of more than 150 seats.  As a result of his massive rout in the subsequent general election, his cabinet resigned en masse.

In November 1928, Kiyoura was elevated to the title of Count (hakushaku). He was posthumously awarded the Grand Cordon of the Supreme Order of the Chrysanthemum in 1942.

Honours
From the corresponding article in the Japanese Wikipedia

Peerages
Baron (27 February 1902)
Viscount (21 September 1907)
Count (10 November 1928)

Decorations
Grand Cordon of the Order of the Sacred Treasure (26 December 1903; Second Class: 26 June 1897; Third Class: 29 December 1895; Fourth Class: 28 December 1893; Fifth Class: 26 December 1890)
Grand Cordon of the Order of the Rising Sun (1 April 1906; Sixth Class: 25 November 1887)
Grand Cordon of the Order of the Rising Sun with Paulownia Flowers (4 September 1920)
Grand Cordon of the Order of the Chrysanthemum (5 November 1942; posthumous)

See also 
 History of Japan

Notes

References 
 Bix, Herbert P. (2000). Hirohito and the Making of Modern Japan. New York: HarperCollins. ; 
 Hane, Mikiso. Modern Japan: A Historical Survey. Westview Press (2001). 
 Jansen, Marius B. (2000). The Making of Modern Japan. Cambridge: Harvard University Press. ;  OCLC 44090600
 Nussbaum, Louis-Frédéric and Käthe Roth. (2005).  Japan encyclopedia. Cambridge: Harvard University Press. ;  OCLC 58053128

External links 

1850 births
1942 deaths
20th-century prime ministers of Japan
Prime Ministers of Japan
People from Kumamoto Prefecture
Kazoku
Members of the House of Peers (Japan)
Government ministers of Japan
Ministers of Home Affairs of Japan
People of Meiji-period Japan
Recipients of the Order of the Rising Sun
Recipients of the Order of the Sacred Treasure
Politicians from Kumamoto Prefecture